The 2018–19 Indiana Hoosiers men's basketball team represented Indiana University in the 2018–19 NCAA Division I men's basketball season. Their head coach was Archie Miller, his second year as Indiana head coach. The team played its home games at Simon Skjodt Assembly Hall in Bloomington, Indiana, as a member of the Big Ten Conference. The season officially kicked off with its annual event, Hoosier Hysteria, on September 29, 2018.

Despite getting off to a strong start of 12–2, which included 3 conference wins, IU struggled mightily down the backstretch of the season. Riddled with injuries and the inability to shoot, the Hoosiers lost 12 of 13 games before turning things around and finishing the regular season with a 4-game winning streak. Having put themselves back into the conversation for making the NCAA Tournament for the first time in 3 years, the Hoosiers looked to knock off Ohio State in the Big Ten tournament. With a win, many bracketologists had IU safely in the field. However, the Hoosiers fell short and lost to Ohio State, 75–79. IU was deemed one of the Last Four Out in the NCAA Tournament, so they earned 1-seed in the NIT, where they advanced to the Quarterfinals before losing to Wichita State, 63–73. Thus, the Hoosiers 119th season ended with an overall record of 19–16 and 8–12 in the Big Ten.

Previous season
Miller's first season was a major remodeling job, starting with laying the foundation of a pack-line defense and valuing possessions. Early in the season, Miller stated practices were 75% defense, 25% offense. That scheme showed early and often, as the Hoosiers struggled mightily throughout the season to find any flow or rhythm on offense, despite the defense making leaps and bounds in the overall rankings of Division 1 basketball. With a surprising early second round loss in the 2018 Big Ten tournament to Rutgers, 67–76, and losing enough games to keep them out of both the NCAA tournament and NIT, including games in which they were favored, such as Indiana State and Fort Wayne, IU's first season under their new coach came to a disappointing close. They finished with an overall record of 16–15 and 9–9 in the Big Ten.

Offseason

Departures
On April 12, 2018, junior forward Juwan Morgan announced he was entering the NBA draft, but he would not sign with an agent. However, on May 29, 2018, it was revealed that he had withdrawn from the draft and would return for his senior season.

Recruiting class
With the commitment of Romeo Langford on April 30, 2018, not only did Archie Miller recruit his first 5-star player, he also landed IU's first Indiana Mr. Basketball since Cody Zeller in 2011. In addition, he also signed two other finalists for the award in Rob Phinisee and Damezi Anderson. Miller rounded out the incoming class with the second best player from Ohio in Jerome Hunter, as well as another 4-star in Jake Forrester from Pennsylvania; this group of high school seniors comprised a Top 10 2018 recruiting class. Within the state of Indiana, there was a total of four 5- and 4-star 2018 recruits, 3 of whom committed to Indiana. The last addition to the team roster was made on May 3, 2018, when graduate transfer Evan Fitzner of Saint Mary's College claimed the final scholarship available.

Roster

Schedule and results
The 2018–19 season will mark the first time in Big Ten history that the teams will play a 20-game conference schedule. The new schedule will also include a regional component to increase the frequency of games among teams in similar areas. Over the course of a six-year cycle (12 playing opportunities), in-state rivals will play each other 12 times, regional opponents will play 10 times, and all other teams will play nine times. Three in-state series that will be guaranteed home-and-homes: Illinois and Northwestern, Indiana and Purdue, and Michigan and Michigan State will always play twice. 

|-
!colspan=12 style=| Exhibition

|-
!colspan=12 style=| Regular Season

|-
!colspan=12 style=| Big Ten tournament

|-
!colspan=12 style=| NIT

Player statistics

Rankings

*AP does not release post-NCAA Tournament rankings^Coaches did not release a week 2 poll

See also
2018–19 Indiana Hoosiers women's basketball team

References

Indiana Hoosiers men's basketball seasons
Indiana
Indiana
Indiana
Indiana